The 1997 AT&T Challenge was a men's tennis tournament played on outdoor clay courts at the Atlanta Athletic Club in Johns Creek, Georgia in the United States and was part of the World Series of the 1997 ATP Tour. It was the 12th edition of the tournament and was held from April 28 through May 4, 1997. Unseeded Marcelo Filippini won the singles title.

Finals

Singles
 Marcelo Filippini defeated  Jason Stoltenberg 7–6(7–2), 6–4
 It was Filippini's 1st title of the year and the 4th of his career.

Doubles
 Jonas Björkman /  Nicklas Kulti defeated  Scott Davis /  Kelly Jones 6–2, 7–6

References

External links
 ITF tournament edition details

ATandT Challenge
Verizon Tennis Challenge
ATandT Challenge